Pawan Kumar may refer to:

 Pawan Kumar (cricketer, born 1959), Indian cricketer, played 2 first-class matches for Hyderabad in 1984/85
 Pawan Kumar (cricketer, born 1969), Indian cricketer, played 21 first-class matches for Tripura between 1991 and 1999
 Pawan Kumar (cricketer, born 1970), Indian cricketer, played first-class cricket for Andhra and Hyderabad in 1993/94
 Pawan Kumar (cricketer, born 1972), Indian cricketer, played 2 first-class matches for Hyderabad in 1995/96
 Pawan Kumar (cricketer, born 1989), Indian cricketer, played first-class first for Puducherry in 2018–19 Ranji Trophy on 12 November 2018
 Pawan Kumar (director) (born 1982), Indian film director, actor and screenwriter
 Pawan Kumar (footballer, born 1990), Indian footballer, goalkeeper for Northeast United FC in Indian Super League
 Pawan Kumar (footballer, born 1995), Indian footballer, centre back for FC Pune City in Indian Super League
 Pawan Kumar (wrestler) (born 1993), Indian wrestler
 Pawan Kumar, Indian Army officer who died in the 2016 Pampore stand-off